Severed Survival is the debut album by Autopsy released in 1989. This album somewhat continues in the style of Reifert's former band Death. Lyrically the band thrives heavily on horror, death and gore concepts; nevertheless these are not inspired directly by horror movies, although the title track is based on Stephen King's short story "Survivor Type." The album was very influential for future death metal acts such as Cannibal Corpse, Entombed, and Dismember. It was also a pioneer of gore lyrics. The album features Steve DiGiorgio on bass.

Various re-releases exist with different bonus tracks and bonus CDs. Furthermore, a different cover exists for this album, which depicts the point of view of the person receiving the autopsy.

The album is notable for its bass sound which was mixed much higher than all the other tracks.

To coincide with the album's 20th anniversary, Peaceville Records released a special two-disc edition of Severed Survival on February 23, 2009. It includes rare rehearsal and live material for a bonus disc as well as demo versions of two songs — "Mauled to Death" and "Human Genocide" — which did not make the final cut on the original album. Also featured in the package is a booklet with notes by the band themselves, detailing the history of Autopsy's early years, with rare photos and images. The reissue also includes two new Autopsy tracks that were recorded in September 2008, and are included on the reissue's second disc.

Track listing
All songs written by Chris Reifert, except where noted.

Personnel
Autopsy
Chris Reifert - Vocals, Drums
Danny Coralles - Guitar
 Eric Cutler - Guitar
Session musician 
Steve DiGiorgio - Bass

Production
 Recorded in January 1989 at Starlight Sound
 Produced by John Marshall and Autopsy
 Engineered by John Marshall
 Cover art by Kent Mathieu
 Cover art by Kev Walker (Alternative cover)

References

Autopsy (band) albums
1989 debut albums
Peaceville Records albums